In mathematics, an integer sequence is a sequence (i.e., an ordered list) of integers.

An integer sequence may be specified explicitly by giving a formula for its nth term, or implicitly by giving a relationship between its terms. For example, the sequence 0, 1, 1, 2, 3, 5, 8, 13, ... (the Fibonacci sequence) is formed by starting with 0 and 1 and then adding any two consecutive terms to obtain the next one: an implicit description. The sequence 0, 3, 8, 15, ... is formed according to the formula n2 − 1 for the nth term: an explicit definition.

Alternatively, an integer sequence may be defined by a property which members of the sequence possess and other integers do not possess. For example, we can determine whether a given integer is a perfect number, even though we do not have a formula for the nth perfect number.

Examples 
Integer sequences that have their own name include:

Abundant numbers
Baum–Sweet sequence
Bell numbers
Binomial coefficients
Carmichael numbers
Catalan numbers
Composite numbers
Deficient numbers
Euler numbers
Even and odd numbers
Factorial numbers
Fibonacci numbers
Fibonacci word
Figurate numbers
Golomb sequence
Happy numbers
Highly composite numbers
Highly totient numbers
Home primes
Hyperperfect numbers
Juggler sequence
Kolakoski sequence
Lucky numbers
Lucas numbers
Motzkin numbers
Natural numbers
Padovan numbers
Partition numbers
Perfect numbers
Prime numbers
Pseudoprime numbers
Recamán's sequence
Regular paperfolding sequence
Rudin–Shapiro sequence
Semiperfect numbers
Semiprime numbers
Superperfect numbers
Thue–Morse sequence
Ulam numbers
Weird numbers
Wolstenholme number

Computable and definable sequences 

An integer sequence is a computable sequence if there exists an algorithm which, given n, calculates an, for all n > 0. The set of computable integer sequences is countable. The set of all integer sequences is uncountable (with cardinality equal to that of the continuum), and so not all integer sequences are computable.

Although some integer sequences have definitions, there is no systematic way to define what it means for an integer sequence to be definable in the universe or in any absolute (model independent) sense.

Suppose the set M is a transitive model of ZFC set theory. The transitivity of M implies that the integers and integer sequences inside M are actually integers and sequences of integers. An integer sequence is a definable sequence relative to M if there exists some formula P(x) in the language of set theory, with one free variable and no parameters, which is true in M for that integer sequence and false in M for all other integer sequences.  In each such M, there are definable integer sequences that are not computable, such as sequences that encode the Turing jumps of computable sets.

For some transitive models M of ZFC, every sequence of integers in M is definable relative to M; for others, only some integer sequences are (Hamkins et al. 2013). There is no systematic way to define in M itself the set of sequences definable relative to M and that set may not even exist in some such M. Similarly, the map from the set of formulas that define integer sequences in M to the integer sequences they define is not definable in M and may not exist in M. However, in any model that does possess such a definability map, some integer sequences in the model will not be definable relative to the model (Hamkins et al. 2013).

If M contains all integer sequences, then the set of integer sequences definable in M will exist in M and be countable and countable in M.

Complete sequences 

A sequence of positive integers is called a complete sequence if every positive integer can be expressed as a sum of values in the sequence, using each value at most once.

See also
 On-Line Encyclopedia of Integer Sequences
 List of OEIS sequences

References

 .

External links
Journal of Integer Sequences. Articles are freely available online.

 
Arithmetic functions